The enzyme 3-phytase (EC 3.1.3.8) catalyzes the reaction

 myo-inositol hexakisphosphate + H2O = 1D-myo-inositol 1,2,4,5,6-pentakisphosphate + phosphate

myo-Inositol hexakisphosphate is also known as phytic acid.

These enzymes belongs to the family of hydrolases, specifically those acting on phosphoric monoester bonds. The systematic name  myo-inositol-hexakisphosphate 3-phosphohydrolase. Other names in common use include 1-phytase, phytate 1-phosphatase, phytate 3-phosphatase, and phytate 6-phosphatase.

Enzymes of this type participate in inositol phosphate metabolism.

Structural studies

See also 

 4-phytase (6-phytase)
 5-phytase
 Protein tyrosine phosphatase

References

EC 3.1.3
Enzymes of known structure